Bartholin is a Danish family name.

Birger Bartholin (born 1910), ballet dancer, teacher and choreographer
Caspar Bartholin the Elder (1585–1629), Danish polymath, physician, and theologian
Caspar Bartholin the Younger (1655–1738), Danish anatomist, son of Thomas Bartholin; eponym of Bartholin's gland, and subsequently Bartholin's cyst
Gustav Bartholin Hagen, (1873–1941), Danish architect
Janus Andreas Bartholin la Cour, (1837–1909), Danish painter
Jorge Cuevas Bartholín, (1885–1961), Chilean-born ballet impresario and choreographer
Rasmus Bartholin (1625–1698), Danish physician and grammarian, son of Caspar Bartholin the Elder
Thomas Bartholin (1616–1680),  Danish physician, mathematician, and theologian, son of Caspar Bartholin the Elder